, often shortened to , and known in English as KochiKame: Tokyo Beat Cops, is a Japanese comedy manga series written and illustrated by Osamu Akimoto. It takes place in the present day, in and around a neighborhood police station (kōban) in the downtown part of Tokyo, and revolves around the misadventures of middle-aged cop Kankichi Ryotsu.

It was continuously serialized in Weekly Shōnen Jump for 40 years, from September 1976 to September 2016. Its 1,960 chapters were collected into 201 tankōbon volumes, making it the manga with the second-highest number of volumes for a single series. The manga has been adapted into an anime television series, produced by Studio Gallop and broadcast in Japan by Fuji TV, three theatrical animated films (by Tatsunoko and Gallop, respectively), two live-action movies, several stage adaptations, and a live-action television series. In addition, a short anime featuring characters from the series was produced to popularize the Paralympic sport of goalball, ahead of the Tokyo Olympics and Paralympics of 2020 (held in 2021).

As of 2016, the manga had over 156.5 million copies in circulation, making it the eighth best-selling manga series in history. In 2005, Kochikame won the Special Judges Award at the 50th Shogakukan Manga Award, as well as the 48th Seiun Award for Best Comic in 2017.

Plot

The KochiKame plot involves Kankichi "Ryo-san" Ryotsu coming up with a money-making scheme by inventing a new gadget or capitalizing on a fad, achieving great success, calling on Keiichi Nakagawa's help as things turn sour, and finally losing it all as the fad runs out of steam or out of control. While the plots are gag-driven, much of the humor comes from the combination of mundane characters with those that are bizarrely out of place; such as Nakagawa who has wealth and Ai Asato who is transgender. What they have in common is everyone's lack of actual police work, most of which is never explained or rationalized in the slightest. (It is explained in Jump that Ryo-san is one of the best officers at catching criminals.) Nakagawa and Reiko Akimoto have special licenses (such as for wearing personal clothes instead of uniforms to work) from police headquarters because of their skills in linguistics.

The plot consistently evolved with the times and most of the main characters do not really age, despite the fact that the series started in the 1970s and is later clearly set in the 2010s. However, some characters do age, like the grandchild of Buchao, who was a baby in the early volumes, but is now close to junior high, which the author has self-mocked in a few "look back" chapters/episodes. KochiKame has a broad audience, ranging from adolescent boys to middle-aged salarymen. Ryo-san's antics appeal to children who can laugh at an old buffoon, and to men fearing that they are becoming old buffoons themselves—and also because it often subtly mocks the latest fads and trends. The stories are generally innocent in content, and what little violence appears is comical, while the occasional risqué subjects are included strictly for laughs rather than to titillate. KochiKames immense popularity has led to guest appearances in the strip by real-life Japanese celebrities such as Tetsuya Komuro.

For creator Osamu Akimoto, KochiKame is an homage to the working-class people and districts of old Tokyo, and most chapters open with an elaborate full-page illustration of a Shitamachi (downtown) street scene, typically with old wooden buildings and boys playing in the streets.

Media

Manga

Written and illustrated by Osamu Akimoto, Kochira Katsushika-ku Kameari Kōen Mae Hashutsujo was continuously serialized in the shōnen manga anthology Weekly Shōnen Jump since September 21, 1976. Akimoto debuted the series under the pen name of "Tatsuhiko Yamadome", but changed to using his real name in 1978, when it reached its 100th chapter. Periodically the chapters were collected into tankōbon volumes by publisher Shueisha, the first released on July 9, 1977. The series ended on September 17, 2016, in the 42nd issue of the year, in commemoration of KochiKames 40th anniversary. Its 200th tankōbon volume was published on the same day. Shueisha reprinted the issue that included the final chapter on December 31, 2016, marking the first time a Weekly Shōnen Jump issue has ever been reprinted. Akimoto created a new chapter of Kochikame for the 42nd issue of Weekly Shōnen Jump on September 16, 2017. On July 18, 2021, it was announced the manga would receive a 201st volume, which was released on October 4, 2021.

From March 2017 to June 2019, Akimoto serialized a sequel in the seinen magazine Ultra Jump. Titled , it is set in a sentō next to a police station in Shitamachi, Tokyo.

Anime

Since KochiKames inception in Jump in 1976, the series was not adapted into anime often, most likely because it would have been more suited for a live-action adaptation. The closest it could get when being adapted into anime was either in the form of commercials for certain products sold in Japan such as toys and snack foods as early as 1980, and a 30-minute animated film produced by Tatsunoko Production which was shown alongside an animated adaptation of Izumi Matsumoto's Kimagure Orange Road (another popular Jump manga from 1984) produced by Studio Pierrot at a Shonen Jump Anime Festival hosted by Shueisha in 1985. It was directed by Hiroshi Sasagawa, who, at the time, was renowned for his directorial work on Tatsunoko's other works such as Speed Racer and the Time Bokan franchise. It was issued on home video by Shueisha under the Jump Video imprint as a prize for winners of a contest that took place in several issues of Weekly Shonen Jump for the magazine's 20th anniversary in 1988. However, to this day only small images of footage from the film can be seen on the internet since the film was not released broadly.

An anime television adaptation of KochiKame finally began airing on Fuji Television on June 16, 1996. Produced by Studio Gallop, it ran for eight years and 382 episodes before ending on December 19, 2004.

On September 18, 2016, an hour-long special by Studio Gallop aired on Fuji TV for the manga's 40th anniversary.  features several voice actors reprising their roles from the previous series, as well as director Akira Shigeno.

In summer of 2006, a dubbed Hindi version of KochiKame began airing on Hungama TV in India, and later on Disney XD India from 2011 to 2013.

Live-action
KochiKame has also had live-action film, a TV drama and stage adaptations. The movie was directed by Kazuhiko Yamaguchi, starred Mitsuo Senda as Ryo-san and was released in 1977. A live-action TV series starring Katori Shingo as Ryo-san began airing on TBS on August 1, 2009. A second live-action movie, based on this TV series and titled KochiKame - The Movie: Save The Kachidiki Bridge!, opened in Japan on August 6, 2011. Another play adaptation opened in September 2016 for the series' 40th anniversary and, like the others, it was directed, written by and stars Lasar Ishii as Ryo-san, who is also the voice actor for the character in anime adaptations.

Other media
As part of its 40th anniversary celebration, the series received a 6-part crossover anthology novel with various characters from other series on September 17, 2016. Titled , the other series are Girls und Panzer, Osomatsu-san, Haruchika, Cheer Boys!!, Sorcerous Stabber Orphen and Nazotoki wa Dinner no Ato de.

Ryotsu appears playable in the Weekly Shōnen Jump crossover fighting video games Jump Super Stars, Jump Ultimate Stars and J-Stars Victory VS. Other characters from the series appear in a non-playable capacity. J-Stars Victory VS.s North American and European release (as J-Stars Victory VS.+) marks the first official release of Kochira Katsushika-ku Kameari Kōen-mae Hashutsujo material in English-speaking territories. In addition, various toys and collectibles have been created, including some items that first appeared in the manga as creations of Ryo-san.

Real-life KochiKame

Kameari Koen is an actual park in Tokyo's Katsushika ward. The police station is fictional, but it is modeled after a real one located on the north side of Kameari railway station. The manga has brought considerable fame to the neighborhood, and it draws sightseers from all over Japan to a (usually vacant) station in a nondescript residential neighborhood. There is only a vacant lot where the police station is actually supposed to be located.

In February 2006, two life-size bronze statues of Ryo-san were erected at the north and south gates of Kameari Station. There is currently a trail of 14 statues in the area.

30th anniversary
In commemoration of the 30th anniversary of Kochira Katsushika-ku Kameari Kōen Mae Hashutsujos serialization, several special events were held. Separate one-shots of the series were published in thirteen different Shueisha magazines between August and October 2006.

Reception
As of 2016, Kochira Katsushika-ku Kameari Kōen-mae Hashutsujo had sold over 156.5million tankōbon copies; making it one of the best-selling manga series in history. With 200 volumes, the series held the Guinness World Record for "Most volumes published for a single manga series" from September 2016 to July 2021.

In November 2014, readers of Da Vinci magazine voted Kochikame the seventh Weekly Shōnen Jumps greatest manga series of all time. Kochikame won the Special Judges Award at the 50th Shogakukan Manga Awards in 2005. Akimoto received the Special Prize at the 21st Tezuka Osamu Cultural Prize for the manga in 2017. Kochikame was awarded the 48th Seiun Award for the Best Comic in 2017. On TV Asahi's Manga Sōsenkyo 2021 poll, in which 150.000 people voted for their top 100 manga series, Kochikame ranked 35th.

In 2005, the anime ranked 36th on its list of the Top 100 Anime conducted by TV Asahi. Mike Toole of Anime News Network included Kochira Katsushika-ku Kameari Kōen-mae Hashutsujo the Movie at number 56 on The Other 100 Best Anime Movies of All Time, a list of "lesser-known, lesser-loved classics." He called it "Kochikame at its best, a zippy combination of daffy comedy and solid action set pieces," with one of the funniest false endings ever.

See also
Kōban, neighborhood police stations in Japan

Notes

References

External links

Official website
Fuji TV KochiKame website
TBS KochiKame website

 
1976 manga
1996 anime television series debuts
1999 anime films
2003 anime films
Anime series based on manga
Comedy anime and manga
Fuji TV original programming
Gallop (studio)
Japanese animated films
Japanese television dramas based on manga
Live-action films based on manga
Manga adapted into films
Police in anime and manga
Shōnen manga
Shueisha franchises
Shueisha manga
TBS Television (Japan) dramas
World record holders
Television shows set in Tokyo
Comics set in Tokyo